General Maddox may refer to:

David M. Maddox (born 1938), U.S. Army four-star general
Halley G. Maddox (1899–1977), U.S. Army major general
William J. Maddox Jr (1921–2001), U.S. Army major general

See also
Sam Maddux Jr. (1915–1990), U.S. Air Force lieutenant general